The 3rd constituency of Aube is a French legislative constituency in the Aube département.  It is currently represented by Angélique Ranc of National Rally (RN).

Description

It is located in the north west corner of the department, and takes in the town of Romilly-sur-Seine, and part of the town of Troyes.

Historic Representation

Election results

2022

 
 
|-
| colspan="8" bgcolor="#E9E9E9"|
|-

2017

2014 by-election

|- style="background-color:#E9E9E9;text-align:center;"
! colspan="2" rowspan="2" style="text-align:left;" | Candidate
! rowspan="2" colspan="2" style="text-align:left;" | Party
! colspan="2" | 1st round
! colspan="2" | 2nd round
|- style="background-color:#E9E9E9;text-align:center;"
! width="75" | Votes
! width="30" | %
! width="75" | Votes
! width="30" | %
|-
| style="background-color:" |
| style="text-align:left;" | Gérard Menuel
| style="text-align:left;" | Union for a Popular Movement
| UMP
| 
| 40.76%
| 
| 63.85%
|-
| style="background-color:" |
| style="text-align:left;" | Bruno Subtil
| style="text-align:left;" | National Front
| FN
| 
| 27.64%
| 
| 36.15%
|-
| style="background-color:" |
| style="text-align:left;" | Olivier Girardin
| style="text-align:left;" | Socialist Party
| PS
| 
| 14.69%
| colspan="2" style="text-align:left;" |
|-
| style="background-color:" |
| style="text-align:left;" | Pierre Mathieu
| style="text-align:left;" | Communist
| COM
| 
| 7.46%
| colspan="2" style="text-align:left;" |
|-
| style="background-color:" |
| style="text-align:left;" | Maxime Beaulieu
| style="text-align:left;" | Europe Ecology – The Greens
| EELV
| 
| 4.47%
| colspan="2" style="text-align:left;" |
|-
| style="background-color:" |
| style="text-align:left;" | Dominique Deharbe
| style="text-align:left;" | Miscellaneous Left
| DVG
| 
| 2.49%
| colspan="2" style="text-align:left;" |
|-
| style="background-color:" |
| style="text-align:left;" | Nelly Collot-Touzet
| style="text-align:left;" | Miscellaneous Right
| DVD
| 
| 2.00%
| colspan="2" style="text-align:left;" |
|-
| style="background-color:" |
| style="text-align:left;" | Nicolas Rosseaux
| style="text-align:left;" | Miscellaneous Right
| DVD
| 
| 0.48%
| colspan="2" style="text-align:left;" |
|-
| colspan="8" style="background-color:#E9E9E9;"|
|- style="font-weight:bold"
| colspan="4" style="text-align:left;" | Total
| 
| 100%
| 
| 100%
|-
| colspan="8" style="background-color:#E9E9E9;"|
|-
| colspan="4" style="text-align:left;" | Registered voters
| 
| style="background-color:#E9E9E9;"|
| 
| style="background-color:#E9E9E9;"|
|-
| colspan="4" style="text-align:left;" | Blank/Void ballots
| 
| 0.67%
| 
| 2.08%
|-
| colspan="4" style="text-align:left;" | Turnout
| 
| 24.63%
| 
| 27.15%
|-
| colspan="4" style="text-align:left;" | Abstentions
| 
| 75.37%
| 
| 72.85%
|-
| colspan="8" style="background-color:#E9E9E9;"|
|- style="font-weight:bold"
| colspan="6" style="text-align:left;" | Result
| colspan="2" style="background-color:" | UMP HOLD
|}

2012

|- style="background-color:#E9E9E9;text-align:center;"
! colspan="2" rowspan="2" style="text-align:left;" | Candidate
! rowspan="2" colspan="2" style="text-align:left;" | Party
! colspan="2" | 1st round
! colspan="2" | 2nd round
|- style="background-color:#E9E9E9;text-align:center;"
! width="75" | Votes
! width="30" | %
! width="75" | Votes
! width="30" | %
|-
| style="background-color:" |
| style="text-align:left;" | François Baroin
| style="text-align:left;" | Union for a Popular Movement
| UMP
| 
| 41.42%
| 
| 56.45%
|-
| style="background-color:" |
| style="text-align:left;" | Lorette Joly
| style="text-align:left;" | Socialist Party
| PS
| 
| 28.79%
| 
| 43.55%
|-
| style="background-color:" |
| style="text-align:left;" | Mireille Cazard
| style="text-align:left;" | National Front
| FN
| 
| 17.79%
| colspan="2" style="text-align:left;" |
|-
| style="background-color:" |
| style="text-align:left;" | Pierre Mathieu
| style="text-align:left;" | Left Front
| FG
| 
| 7.18%
| colspan="2" style="text-align:left;" |
|-
| style="background-color:" |
| style="text-align:left;" | Alain Carsenti
| style="text-align:left;" | 
| CEN
| 
| 1.51%
| colspan="2" style="text-align:left;" |
|-
| style="background-color:" |
| style="text-align:left;" | Dominique Deharbe
| style="text-align:left;" | Miscellaneous Left
| DVG
| 
| 0.79%
| colspan="2" style="text-align:left;" |
|-
| style="background-color:" |
| style="text-align:left;" | Véronique Guidat
| style="text-align:left;" | Miscellaneous Right
| DVD
| 
| 0.71%
| colspan="2" style="text-align:left;" |
|-
| style="background-color:" |
| style="text-align:left;" | Pierre Bissey
| style="text-align:left;" | Far Left
| EXG
| 
| 0.61%
| colspan="2" style="text-align:left;" |
|-
| style="background-color:" |
| style="text-align:left;" | Chislain Wysocinski
| style="text-align:left;" | Ecologist
| ECO
| 
| 0.53%
| colspan="2" style="text-align:left;" |
|-
| style="background-color:" |
| style="text-align:left;" | Sylvanie Kletty
| style="text-align:left;" | Ecologist
| ECO
| 
| 0.45%
| colspan="2" style="text-align:left;" |
|-
| style="background-color:" |
| style="text-align:left;" | Christian Bernaud
| style="text-align:left;" | Far Left
| EXG
| 
| 0.23%
| colspan="2" style="text-align:left;" |
|-
| style="background-color:" |
| style="text-align:left;" | Maurice Bernardie
| style="text-align:left;" | Miscellaneous Left
| DVG
| 
| 0.00%
| colspan="2" style="text-align:left;" |
|-
| colspan="8" style="background-color:#E9E9E9;"|
|- style="font-weight:bold"
| colspan="4" style="text-align:left;" | Total
| 
| 100%
| 
| 100%
|-
| colspan="8" style="background-color:#E9E9E9;"|
|-
| colspan="4" style="text-align:left;" | Registered voters
| 
| style="background-color:#E9E9E9;"|
| 
| style="background-color:#E9E9E9;"|
|-
| colspan="4" style="text-align:left;" | Blank/Void ballots
| 
| 1.04%
| 
| 3.24%
|-
| colspan="4" style="text-align:left;" | Turnout
| 
| 57.79%
| 
| 55.46%
|-
| colspan="4" style="text-align:left;" | Abstentions
| 
| 42.21%
| 
| 44.54%
|-
| colspan="8" style="background-color:#E9E9E9;"|
|- style="font-weight:bold"
| colspan="6" style="text-align:left;" | Result
| colspan="2" style="background-color:" | UMP HOLD
|}

2007

2002

 
 
 
 
 
 
|-
| colspan="8" bgcolor="#E9E9E9"|
|-

1997

 
 
 
 
 
 
 
 
|-
| colspan="8" bgcolor="#E9E9E9"|
|-

Sources
 French Interior Ministry results website:

References

3